The Musée de l'Histoire vivante (Museum of Living History) is an historical museum located in Montreuil-sous-bois, adjacent to the eastern part of Paris, France.

Created in 1937 by the Association pour l'Histoire Vivante (Association for Living History) under the impulse of Communist politician Jacques Duclos, it opened its doors on 23 March 1939 for the 150th anniversary of the French Revolution.  was entrusted with the management of the project. He then dealt with the history of social movements, colonization and decolonization, as well as the suburbs and industrial heritage of the city of Montreuil. Since then, its domain has expanded, notably through temporary exhibitions.

History of the Museum 
During the Second World War, the museum's collections were hidden in a farm in Seine-et-Marne. It officially reopened to the public on 22 June 1946. Later, it presented new rooms devoted to the Occupation and Libération. A room is also dedicated to Karl Marx.

In the 1960s and 1970s, a significant drop in attendance led to the museum's semi-closing, not all spaces being opened to the visitors.

After a complete renovation (refurbishment of the rooms, creation of a reserve, computerization of funds, new presentation of the permanent exhibition), the museum reopened its doors in September 1988, with a temporary exhibition devoted to "Jean Jaurès and the French Revolution".

The Museum today 
The museum houses iconographic collections from the Revolution to the 1960s as well as archival collections of several activists and leaders of the French Communist Party (Jacques Duclos, Daniel Renoult, archives of socialist and far-left activists, in particular.

The museum houses a space dedicated to the memory of Hô Chi Minh, the first President of the Democratic Republic of Vietnam, for his fight against colonialism.

The institution publishes or co-produces historical works, exhibition catalogues, postcards and documentary films. It is also a place of archival resources for researchers and historians.

Its pedagogical activity has intensified and it works in partnership with the association "Citoyenneté Jeunesse" to present teachers and their students with various pedagogical workshops. Modules of images introduce the pupils of schools (from primary to secondary school) to different themes: French revolution, colonial imagery, the image and representation of woman/women from the French Revolution to the present day, urban habitat: garden cities and large complexes, discovery and liberation of Nazi camps, image of propaganda...).

References

External links 
 Official website of the Musée de l'Histoire vivante
 Musée de l'Histoire vivante on the site of the city of Montreuil
 Musée de l'histoire vivante in l'Humanité (13 November 2017)
 Musée de l'histoire vivante on lapetitecouronne.tv
 Musée de l'histoire vivante on culture.gouv.fr
 Musée de l'histoire vivante on ouesktes.com
 Musée de l'Histoire vivante on Futura
 Le musée de l’Histoire vivante de Montreuil on Cairn.info
 Le Musée de l'Histoire vivante on JSTOR

Museums in Seine-Saint-Denis
Socialism
Marxism
Syndicalism
Colonialism
Decolonization
Communism in France